Associação Juventude de Viana is a rink hockey club from Viana do Castelo, Portugal. Its senior team participates in the Portuguese Roller Hockey First Division. Juventude de Viana as is most commonly known was founded December 1, 1976, by six friends.

External links
 Official website

Rink hockey clubs in Portugal